Kang Hwagil (born 1986) is a South Korean writer and feminist who writes primarily about women, often using unreliable narrators. Her writing is influenced by gothic romance and thrillers written by women in the 19th century. She is a recipient of the Munhakdongne Young Writers’ Award (2017) and the Hankyoreh Literary Award (2017).

Life
Kang Hwagil was born in Jeonju, North Jeolla Province, South Korea, in 1986. As an introverted child, she enjoyed reading, and entered multiple writing contests as a teenager. She attended Jeonbuk National University, and was active in a literary review club she joined due to her frustration with the lack of available creative writing classes. After taking a semester off from university to focus on writing, she graduated with a degree in Korean literature, and enrolled in a graduate program for writing at the Korea National University of Arts.

Her literary debut was in 2012 with the short story "Room" ("Bang").

Writing
Kang Hwagil was influenced by the works of 19th-century Western women writers, including the Brontë sisters and Mary Shelley, and has described herself as being particularly interested in gothic romance and thriller narratives. Her fiction often pays homage to the typical style and atmosphere found in mysteries and thrillers. Kang has expressed her admiration for the works of Shirley Jackson in particular, even quoting her in the afterword for A Good Person (2016). The quote was from a time when Jackson was being emotionally abused by her husband, connecting the themes of women's liberation to Kang's book.

Kang's writing typically involves unreliable narration, along with other techniques used to create an environment of anxiety and fear. Since the majority of Kang's protagonists are women, the situations they experience tend to be real-life events women encounter.

Young Feminists
Kang Hwagil is part of a group of younger Korean women writers known as "Young Feminists", born in the 1990s or 2000s, in contrast to the previous generation of Korean women writers. The primary difference between the two generations is in regards to the portrayal of women in their stories; while the previous generation would typically allude to violence against women in their writing, the younger generation explicitly portrays women as political agents, actively fighting against violence against women through their literature. Apart from Kang, other "Young Feminists" include the writers Choi Eunyoung, Cho Nam-ju, and Park Min-jung.

Kang's writing consistently about women's issues have resulted in her being described as a feminist writer, particularly in regards to stories such as A Good Person (2016) and A Different Person (2017). Kang has stated that, although she feels women's issues are important and that she is obligated to write about them, she is careful not to make them the sole focus of her work, explaining that many people have warned her since her debut about the possibility of being stereotyped as a female writer who writes only about women. Kang, however, believes that self-regulation or self-censorship out of fear of being stereotyped as such will only result in limiting the discussion of women's issues to "personal problems".

Works

Works in Korean
Short story collections
 A Good Person (2016) 
 We Loved (2018) 

Novels
 A Different Person (2017) 

Short stories
 "Room" (2012)
 "A Good Person"
 "Nikola Kindergarten - A Precious Person
 "Lake - Other People"
 "Demon"
 "Seo-u" (2018)

In anthologies
 "Imperial Princess", in Everyday We (2018) 
 "Camila", in Don't Stop Loving (2018) 
 "Not Forgotten, Even in Dreams", in Melancholy Happy Ending (2019)

Works in English
 Seo-u (ASIA Publishers, 2018), translated by Stella Kim 
 Demons (Strangers Press, 2019), translated by Mattho Mandersloot

Awards
 Munhakdongne Young Writers’ Award (2017)
 Hankyoreh Literary Award (2017) (for Dareun saram)
 Ku Sang Literature Prize for Young Writers (2018) (for Seo-u)

References 

South Korean women short story writers
South Korean short story writers
1986 births
Living people
21st-century South Korean women writers
People from Jeonju
South Korean women novelists
South Korean novelists
South Korean feminists
Feminist writers
21st-century short story writers
21st-century novelists
Jeonbuk National University alumni